Events from the year 1569 in Ireland.

Incumbent
Monarch: Elizabeth I

Events
Sir Edmund Butler of Cloughgrenan leads a revolt against the Lord Deputy of Ireland, Sir Henry Sidney, in Leinster.

Births
 Niall Garve O'Donnell (Niall Garbh Ó Domhnaill), last Prince of Tyrconnell (d. 1626)
 Geoffrey Keating (Seathrún Céitinn), Roman Catholic priest, poet and historian (d. c.1644)

 
1560s in Ireland
Ireland
Years of the 16th century in Ireland